Girona (Catalan:  Estació de Girona) is a railway station serving the city of Girona in Catalonia, Spain.

The station is on the Barcelona–Cerbère conventional rail line and the Perpignan–Barcelona high-speed rail line. It is served by Rodalies de Catalunya regional line  and Girona commuter rail service line , as well as by several national and international AVE and TGV high-speed services operated by Renfe Operadora and SNCF.

History
This station was opened in 1862, when Iberian gauge trains on the Barcelona–Cerbère line started arriving from Maçanet de la Selva. From 1892, the station was also served by narrow gauge trains on the Sant Feliu de Guíxols–Girona railway and, from 1898, by narrow gauge trains on the Olot–Girona railway. Both these narrow gauge lines closed in 1969. Girona's third narrow gauge line, the Palamós–Girona–Banyoles railway that served the city between 1921 and 1956, terminated some distance away at Porta de França.

The Iberian gauge station was re-located onto an elevated viaduct in 1973. By 2012, the station, while remaining in the same location, was planned to become subterranean with all tracks including the new high speed from Barcelona to France moved underground. However, due to severe work delays the underground station opened on 8 January 2013 with only the standard gauge high speed tracks, and the elevated station remains in service.

Station layout
Girona station has tracks on two levels. Trains on the original Barcelona–Cerbère line operate via a set of high-level platforms situated on a viaduct, whilst trains on the new high speed line from Barcelona to France operate through a set of low-level platforms.

The station has a large passenger building underneath the high-level tracks, where there are several services including commercial establishments. The Girona bus station is located just next door. The trains run on the upper level, which is accessed by stairs, escalators, and elevators. This level has a total of four tracks: two general, one Iberian gauge siding on one side and one standard gauge siding on the other side. There are a total of three platforms, partially covered by canopies, and a building on the right of way dedicated to traffic and various services related to railways.

There are four standard gauge tracks, on either side of two island platforms. The platforms are accessed by stairs, escalators, and elevators from an entrance hall above the tracks.

References

External links

 Girona listing at the Adif website
 Girona listing at the Rodalies de Catalunya website
 Information and photos of the station at trenscat.cat 

Buildings and structures in Girona
Railway stations in Catalonia
Railway stations in Spain opened in 1862
Rodalies de Catalunya stations
Transport in Girona
Madrid–Barcelona high-speed rail line